Kieran Culhane was a Gaelic footballer from County Kerry. He played with the Kerry senior team in the late 1980s and early 1990s. He won a Munster Championship medal at full back in 1991.

He played club football with his local Ballylongford team. He won North Kerry Senior Football Championship titles with them in 1993 and 2000.

References
 http://www.terracetalk.com/kerry-football/player/190/Kieran-Culhane/Championship

Year of birth missing (living people)
Living people
Ballylongford Gaelic footballers
Kerry inter-county Gaelic footballers
Munster inter-provincial Gaelic footballers